Prosimnia semperi is a species of sea snail, a marine gastropod mollusk in the family Ovulidae, the ovulids, cowry allies or false cowries.

Description

Distribution

P. semperi is native to the coasts of Madagascar and parts of South Africa.

References

Ovulidae
Gastropods described in 1881